Kalegah-e Amid Ali (also Romanized as Kālegah-e Amīd ʿAlī; also known as Kalegah and Kālegeh) is a village in Sar Firuzabad Rural District, Firuzabad District, Kermanshah County, Kermanshah Province, Iran. At the 2006 census, its population was 100, in 21 families.

References 

Populated places in Kermanshah County